

Provinces

British Columbia: ~60%  
Alberta: 58%    (NAIT)
Saskatchewan: 50%  (SK Environmental Society)
Manitoba: 48%  (MB Forestry Branch)
Ontario: 66%   (Ontario Forest Industries Association)
Quebec: 45%  (McGill University)
Nova Scotia: ~75%
Prince Edward Island: 45%  (2000, PEI )
New Brunswick: ~85%  (Riparian Habitat Restoration)
Newfoundland and Labrador: ~45% of Newfoundland.  60% of Labrador  (NF Heritage Society)

Territories

Northwest Territories: ~50%
Nunavut: ~25%
Yukon: ~55%

See also

Forest cover by state, U.S.
Forest cover by state, Australia
Forest cover by state in India
Forest cover by federal subject in Russia

References

 
Forestry-related lists